Masri also Masry is a slang word meaning Egyptian. It also refers to the Egyptian Arabic, spoken by most contemporary Egyptians.

Masri or Masry may also refer to:

 Egyptians, people native to Egypt and the citizens of that country sharing a common culture and dialect

People

Given name
 Masri Feki (fl. 2007–2013), French writer and researcher

Surname
 Bashar Masri (born 1961), Palestinian American entrepreneur
 Edward L. Masry (1932-2005), American lawyer of Syrian origin
 Jaled el Masri, a Syrian citizen
 Jaled el Masri, a German citizen
 Mai Masri (born 1959), Palestinian filmmaker
 Mark Masri (born 1973), Canadian-Lebanese singer, songwriter and music producer
 Mona Masri (born 1985), Swedish journalist, critic and radio host
 Tariq Masri (born 1973), American bassoonist

Other uses
 El-Masry, an Egyptian football team in Port Said

See also

 Al-Masri, a surname
 Mosseri, a surname